The Chenal Ecarté (The Snye) is a river in the municipalities of Saint Clair (Lambton County) and Chatham-Kent (formerly in Kent County) in Southwestern Ontario, Canada. It is a left distributary of the St. Clair River that flows to Lake St. Clair, and thus is part of the Great Lakes Basin. The river also separates mainland Ontario from the northeast edge of Walpole Island, and the entire eastern edge of St. Anne Island, which both are part of the Walpole Island 46 reserve of the Walpole Island First Nation.

It flows southeast into Chatham-Kent, then turns south. The distributary Johnston Channel exits from the right bank towards Lake St. Clair. Lake St. Clair flows via the Detroit River to Lake Erie.

Tributaries
(in downstream order; all are left tributaries)
Marshy Creek
Grape Run
Sydenham River
Maxwell Creek
Little Bear Creek

Distributaries
Johnston Channel (right)
Running Creek (left)

References

Rivers of Chatham-Kent
Rivers of Lambton County